Jangheung County (Jangheung-gun) is a county in South Jeolla Province, South Korea.

Slow city
In 2007 Jangheung was designated as a slow city. It was the first slow city designation in Asia.

Spot for filming
Festival (1996) was filmed in Jangheung county by director Im Kwon-taek.

Eulalia
Jangheung's Cheonkwan Mt. is known for its scenery and eulalias. These plants reach full height around mid-September and until October.

Symbols
 Bird : Dove
 Flower : Azalea
 Tree : Camellia

Special products
The county is known for its production of Shiitake mushrooms.

Eeco-friendly cultivation methods are used county-wide to raise crops used in Korean medicine. Jangheung county received an official award in 2006 for growing high-quality crops.

Climate

Tourist spot
Vivi Ecotopia

Sister cities
 Haiyan, Taishan, China
 Dongjak-gu, Seoul South Korea since 1997
 Yeongdo-gu, Busan, South Korea
 Bundang, South Korea

See also
 Cittaslow(Slow city)

References

External links
County government home page(in English)
County government home page(in Korean)

 
Counties of South Jeolla Province